Amaravella (from Sanskrit amaravella), or the Cosmists (Космисты), was a group of young Soviet artists active between 1923 and 1928.

Formation 
In 1922, the artists group was founded by Fateyev, a painter who was then 32 years old. The name Amaravella, however, was introduced in 1928 when Sardan coined it based from a Sanskrit word that means "bearing light" or "creative energy".

Style 
Ideologically the group belonged to the Russian cosmism movement. It embraced a range of ideas and artistic approaches that explored cosmic harmony. The artists, who lived in a commune, were heavily influenced by the ancient East's works, as well as those of Helena Blavatsky, Nicholas Roerich, Mikalojus Konstantinas Čiurlionis, and Victor Borisov-Musatov. 

Like M. Sokolov and V. Komarovskiy, members of the Amaravella were persecuted because their work did not conform to the "socialist realism" style prescribed for Soviet art. Particularly, their works were categorized as "formalism" through the 1932 decree On Restructuring Literary and Artistic Organizations, which repressed creative freedom.

Works 
Several paintings of the Amaravella artists were collected by Iury Linnik, who claimed to be a cosmist poet and philosopher, and Igor Savitsky.

References

1923 establishments in Russia
1928 disestablishments in Russia
Arts organizations disestablished in the 20th century
Arts organizations established in 1923
Cosmism
Russian artist groups and collectives
Russian avant-garde
Soviet artists